Franz Schubert's final chamber work, the String Quintet in C major (D. 956, Op. posth. 163) is sometimes called the "Cello Quintet" because it is scored for a standard string quartet plus an extra cello instead of the extra viola which is more usual in conventional string quintets. It was composed in 1828 and completed just two months before the composer's death. The first public performance of the piece did not occur until 1850, and publication occurred three years later in 1853.  Schubert's only full-fledged string quintet, it has been praised as "sublime" or "extraordinary" and as possessing "bottomless pathos," and is generally regarded as Schubert's finest chamber work as well as one of the greatest compositions in all chamber music.

Composition and publication history
The string quintet was composed in the summer or early autumn of 1828,  at the same time as Schubert composed his last three piano sonatas and several of the Schwanengesang songs.  Schubert completed it in late September or early October, just two months before his death.  Schubert submitted it to one of his publishers, Heinrich Albert Probst, for consideration, saying that "finally I have written a quintet for 2 violins, 1 viola, and 2 violoncelli ... the quintet rehearsal will only begin in the next few days. Should any of these compositions by any chance commend themselves to you, please let me know." Probst replied, asking only to see some of Schubert's vocal works and requesting more popular piano music. Even at this very late stage in Schubert's career, he was regarded as a composer who mainly focused on songs and piano pieces, and was definitely not taken seriously as a chamber music composer.  The work remained unpublished at the time of Schubert's death in November 1828; the manuscript was sold to the Viennese publisher Diabelli by Schubert's brother Ferdinand shortly thereafter, but was neglected and indeed waited twenty-five years for its first publication in 1853. The manuscript and all sketches are now lost. The first known public performance occurred only three years earlier, on 17 November 1850 at the Musikverein in Vienna.

Instrumentation and genre
The work is the only full-fledged string quintet in Schubert's oeuvre.  When he began composing his string quintet, Schubert had already composed an impressive body of chamber music for strings, including at least fifteen string quartets, most of which were composed for domestic performance by his family's string quartet.

Schubert selected the key of C major in a possible gesture to two composers he greatly admired, Mozart and Beethoven, both of whom wrote string quintets in that key, Mozart's String Quintet No. 3 in C major, K. 515 and Beethoven's String Quintet, Op. 29 in C major.  According to Charles Rosen, the opening theme of Schubert's work emulates many characteristics of the Mozart quintet's opening theme, such as decorative turns, irregular phrase lengths, and rising staccato arpeggios (the latter appear only in Schubert's recapitulation).

But whereas the string quintets of Mozart and Beethoven are composed for a string quartet augmented by a second viola, Schubert adopts a somewhat unconventional instrumentation, employing two cellos instead of two violas, creating richness in the lower register.  Before Schubert, Luigi Boccherini had replaced the second viola with a second cello; however, Schubert's use of the second cello is very different from Boccherini's, who uses the additional cello to create an additional viola line. Alfred Einstein has proposed that Schubert's use of a second cello to enhance the lower strings may have been suggested by George Onslow, who used a double bass in some of his quintets.

Analysis
The string quintet consists of four movements in the usual quick-slow-scherzo-quick pattern:
Allegro ma non troppo
Adagio
Scherzo. Presto – Trio. Andante sostenuto
Allegretto

First movement: Allegro ma non troppo
In common with other late Schubert works (notably, the symphony in C major, D. 944, the piano sonata in B-flat major, D. 960, and the string quartet in G major, D. 887), the quintet opens with an extremely expansive movement: an Allegro ma non troppo that accounts for more than one third of the total length of the piece (typically, 50 minutes). The movement is notable for its unexpected harmonic turns. The exposition, lasting 154 bars, begins with an expansive C major chord: as in the G major quartet, D. 887, Schubert here "presents his harmonies—rather than a memorable, well-contoured melody—without a regular rhythmic pulse." This is followed by music of gradually increasing motion and tension, leading to the contrasting second subject, in the unexpected key of E-flat, introduced as a duet between the two celli.  The exposition concludes with a dominant (G major) chord that leads naturally back to the opening tonic chord on the repeat.  However, after the repeat of the exposition, Schubert begins the development section with a daring modulation from the dominant to the submediant that "lift[s] the music magically" from G major to A major.

Second movement: Adagio
The "sublime" second movement, one of Schubert's rare adagios, is in three-part ABA (ternary) form.  The outer sections, in E major, are of an otherworldly tranquility, while the central section is intensely turbulent: it breaks suddenly into the tranquility in the distant key of F minor.  When the opening music returns, there is a running 32nd-note passage in the second cello which seems to have been motivated by the turbulence that came before it. In the last three measures of the movement, Schubert ties the entire movement together harmonically with a modulation to the F minor of the middle section and an immediate return to E major.

The use of ternary structure to contrast tranquil outer sections with a turbulent central section resembles the second movement of Schubert's Piano Sonata in A major, D. 959, composed at the same time as the quintet.

The juxtaposition of E major and F minor, exceedingly distantly related keys, establishes the importance of the "tonal relationship of lowered second degree" (or flat supertonic) "to the tonic" which will be exploited in the third and fourth movements.

Third movement: Scherzo
The Scherzo, beginning in C major, is symphonic and large-scaled, with the open strings of the lower instruments exploited in an innovative manner  that creates a volume of sound seemingly beyond the capabilities of five stringed instruments. The first section moves to A major and then back to C major. The middle section of this movement moves to E major, then B major, which is VI of III. The C major theme returns at the end. The Trio is in D-flat major, creating another important flat-supertonic relationship.

Fourth movement: Allegretto
The last movement is an exuberant sonata-rondo whose form resembles that of the finale of Mozart's C major quintet   The main theme demonstrates clear Hungarian influences.  The movement is in C major, but is built upon the interplay of the major and minor modes. It has unusual technical features, such as the final two notes: the flat supertonic (D-flat) and the tonic (C), played forte in all parts.

Legacy
After Schubert's string quintet was belatedly premiered and published in the 1850s, it gradually gained recognition as a masterpiece.

An early admirer was Brahms whose Piano Quintet (1865) was inspired in part by the newly discovered work. Brahms, in fact, originally wrote that work as a string quintet with two cellos (the complement used by Schubert) and only later recast it as a piano quintet.  The piano quintet is in F minor, the key of the turbulent central section of Schubert's Adagio, while the third movement recalls the C minor/major of Schubert's Quintet, and that movement ends in the same manner as Schubert's finale, with strong emphasis on the flat supertonic D-flat, before the final tonic C.

Schubert's quintet was also orchestrated by the Japanese conductor and composer Hidemaro Konoye.

Current consensus holds that the Quintet represents a high point in the entire chamber repertoire.

Although there is no reason to believe Schubert expected to die so soon after composing the work, the fact that the quintet was completed a mere two months before his death has inspired some listeners to hear in it a valedictory or death-haunted quality.  For John Reed, the quintet prefigures Schubert's death, ending as it does with D-flat followed by C, both in unison and octaves: "As Browning's Abt Vogler put it, 'Hark, I have dared and done, for my resting place is found, The C major of this life; so, and now I will try to sleep.'"   The violinist Joseph Saunders had the second theme of the first movement carved on his tombstone; Arthur Rubinstein's wish was to have the second  movement played at his funeral.

The second movement's plaintive mood makes it popular as background music for pensive or nocturnal scenes in film.  Examples include Nocturne Indien, Conspiracy, The Human Stain, and Jim Jarmusch's The Limits of Control. Also, Episode 21 from the Inspector Morse television series (Dead on Time) draws extensively from this quintet, as does Episode 16 (Lazaretto) of its prequel Endeavour, and certain episodes in Desmond Morris's BBC series The Human Animal.

Notable recordings
Schubert's string quintet has often been recorded. The first recording was made by the Cobbett Quartet in 1925. Two recordings from the early 1950s are widely cited as legendary: a 1952 performance featuring Isaac Stern and Alexander Schneider, violins; Milton Katims, viola; and Pablo Casals and Paul Tortelier, cellos; and a 1951 performance by the Hollywood String Quartet with Kurt Reher on second cello (a 1994 CD reissue of this performance was awarded a Gramophone Award).

Among modern recordings, that featuring the Melos Quartet with Mstislav Rostropovich (1977) has been acclaimed, and is notable for the exceptionally slow tempo adopted for the Adagio.  Rostropovich later recorded the quintet with the Emerson String Quartet (12/1990) on the occasion of the gala concert celebrating the 125th anniversary of the BASF AG, Ludwigshafen.  A few recordings of the quintet performed on period instruments exist, including a 1990 recording on the Vivarte label with the following lineup: Vera Beths and Lisa Rautenberg, violins; Steven Dann, viola; and Anner Bylsma and Kenneth Slowik, cellos.

Notes

References

External links
 
 A string quintet ensemble from The Chamber Music Society of Lincoln Center presents a complete audio recording of the Quintet:  (location of the performance: Isabella Stewart Gardner Museum, Boston, MP3)
 Complete 50-Minutes Video: A string quintet ensemble led by Susanna Yoko Henkel performs 2008 at the Zagreb International Chamber Music Festival Schubert's C-major-Quintet, together with Stefan Milenkovich (violin), Guy Ben-Ziony (viola), Giovanni Sollima (cello) and Monika Leskovar (cello): Allegro – Adagio – Scherzo/Trio – Allegretto
 
Schubert Most Sublime: The String Quintet in C NPR.

Chamber music by Franz Schubert
Schubert
1828 compositions
Compositions by Franz Schubert published posthumously
Compositions in C major